Rhagonycha mandibularis is a species of soldier beetles in the family Cantharidae. It is found in North America.

References

 Delkeskamp, Kurt (1977). "Cantharidae". Coleopterorum Catalogus Supplementa, pars 165, fasc. 1, 485.

Further reading

 Arnett, R. H. Jr., M. C. Thomas, P. E. Skelley and J. H. Frank. (eds.). (21 June 2002). American Beetles, Volume II: Polyphaga: Scarabaeoidea through Curculionoidea. CRC Press LLC, Boca Raton, Florida .
 Arnett, Ross H. (2000). American Insects: A Handbook of the Insects of America North of Mexico. CRC Press.
 Richard E. White. (1983). Peterson Field Guides: Beetles. Houghton Mifflin Company.

External links

 NCBI Taxonomy Browser, Rhagonycha mandibularis

Cantharidae
Beetles described in 1837